Arvondor Apartments is a historic three-story apartment building in Ogden, Utah. It was built in 1925 for investor William T. Pickett, and designed in the Prairie School architectural style. It has been listed on the National Register of Historic Places since December 31, 1987.

References

Buildings and structures in Ogden, Utah
National Register of Historic Places in Weber County, Utah
Prairie School architecture in Utah
Residential buildings completed in 1925
1925 establishments in Utah